Mike Pitts,  is an English freelance journalist and archaeologist who specialises in the study of British prehistory. He is the author of several books on the subject, and is the editor of British Archaeology, the publication of the Council for British Archaeology.

Biography
He first studied archaeology at school, at Ardingly College in Sussex. He gained a degree in archaeology from the then-independent Institute of Archaeology in Bloomsbury, London before moving to Avebury, Wiltshire as the Curator of the Alexander Keiller Museum. His first book, Fairweather Eden: Life in Britain half a million years ago as revealed by the excavations at Boxgrove (1998), which was co-written with fellow English archaeologist Mark Roberts, dealt with the excavations that had been undertaken at the Lower Palaeolithic site of Boxgrove Quarry by Roberts' team.

He directed excavations at Stonehenge 1979–80, and co-directed the excavation there of one of the Aubrey Holes in 2008. He regularly broadcasts on BBC radio as archaeologist and critic. In 2000 the British Archaeological Press Award was given "to the Guardian and their reporters Mike Pitts and Maev Kennedy for the consistent high standard of articles which appear in that paper". On 15 May 2003, he was elected a Fellow of the Society of Antiquaries of London (FSA).

Bibliography

Academic

Books

 
 (with Mark Roberts)

 (with James O. Davies, photographer)

Articles
"Hides and antlers: a new look at the gatherer-hunter site at Star Carr, North Yorkshire, England”, World Archaeology 11 (1979), 32–42.
“Some aspects of change in flaked stone industries of the mesolithic and neolithic in southern Britain”, Journal of Archaeological Science 6 (1979, with R Jacobi), 163–77.
"On the road to Stonehenge: report on investigations beside the A344 in 1968, 1979 and 1980”, Proceedings of the Prehistoric Society 48 (1982), 75–132.
"What future for Avebury?" Antiquity 64 (1990), 259–74.
"The stone axe in neolithic Britain", Proceedings of the Prehistoric Society 61 (1996), 311–71.
"Excavating the Sanctuary: new investigations on Overton Hill, Avebury”, Wiltshire Archaeological & Natural History Magazine 94 (2001), 1–23.
“An Anglo-Saxon decapitation and burial at Stonehenge”, Wiltshire Archaeological & Natural History Magazine 95 (2002, with A Bayliss, J McKinley, A Boylston, P Budd, J Evans, C Chenery, A Reynolds & S Semple), 131–46.
“A photo by Bill Brandt, and the intimacy of perceptions of Stonehenge and landscape”, Landscapes 9 (2008), 1–27.
“A year at Stonehenge”, Antiquity 83 (2009), 184–94.

Journalistic
"Homo alone... and not at all Neanderthal", Guardian Online (17 July 1997).
"Bog bodies are the archaeologist's dream come true: The living dead”, Guardian Weekend (28 March 1998), 38–43.
”Obituary Gerald Hawkins”, Guardian (24 July 2003).
”Memory failures: the damage done to Babylon has impaired the prospect of understanding a glorious ancient civilisation”, Guardian (17 January 2005).
”Beginner's guide to archaeology”, Guardian G2 (28 August 2009).
”Are the Parthenon marbles really so special?” Guardian (3 April 2012).

References

Footnotes

Sources

External links
Mike Pitts's personal blog
Interview in Papers from the Institute of Archaeology

Year of birth missing (living people)
Living people
People educated at Ardingly College
English archaeologists
English male journalists
Fellows of the Society of Antiquaries of London
Alumni of the UCL Institute of Archaeology